Verbum may refer to:
Word, the smallest element that may be uttered in isolation with semantic or pragmatic content
Verb, from the Latin verbum meaning word, is a word (part of speech) that in syntax conveys an action or a state of being
Logos, an important term in philosophy, psychology, rhetoric, and religion
Dei verbum, one of the principal documents of the Second Vatican Council
Verbum (magazine), an early personal computer and computer art magazine focusing on interactive art and computer graphics
Verbum (Slovak magazine), a Slovak language magazine focused primarily on writings of the Catholic intelligentsia
A 1942 lithograph by M. C. Escher
A version of Logos Bible Software designed to help Catholics to study the Bible and understand Catholic tradition